Hydrophilinae is a subfamily of Hydrophilidae that contains five tribes in 33 genera after the classification was revised by Short and Fikáček in 2013.

Tribes
Updated to Short and Fikáček (2013).
 Amphiopini 
 Berosini
 Hydrobiusini
 Hydrophilini
 Laccobiini
From Short and Fikåček (2011).

References

 
Polyphaga subfamilies